Joel Amadi, known as Joe El, (born 23 March) is a Nigerian afrobeat singer, songwriter, and performer, signed with Kennis Music. In 2006, he participated in the Star Quest singing competition in Jos and later on in the annual Kennis Music Easter fiesta.

Family and education 
Joel Amadi was born to the Amadi Didam family in Sokoto, Sokoto State. He, however, grew up in Kano State. His father came from Zikpak, Kafanchan, Southern Kaduna State, and his mother from Otukpa, Benue State. After his primary education at Ramat Nursery and Primary School, he attended Army Day Secondary School, Bukavo Barracks, Kano State, from where after he graduated, and subsequently decided to proceed to study at the Kaduna State College of Education, Kafanchan (which is affiliated to the University of Jos), graduating in the year 2005 with a diploma in Accounting and Auditing.

Several news-media reported the songwriter posting on 24 July 2020 about the murder of his father (brother to the late monarch, Agwam Musa Didam, Agwam Fantswam I alongside the late monarch's wife) by Fulani herdsmen in his hometown, expressing his sadness and disappointment on the governor's handling of security in the state. Speaking with The Guardian, he called on the federal and state government to speak up against the killings bedevilling the Southern part of his state.

Musical career
Joe El began his musical career in 2006, when he participated in the Star Quest singing competition which was his first TV appearance. In 2009, he moved to Lagos where he hoped for better chances. He eventually met Kenny Ogungbe, the CEO of Kennis Music who offered him a contract in 2010. His debut single "I No Mind" was later nominated for the Best R'n'b Video at the NMVA 2011 awards.

He achieved more popularity with his award-winning track "Bakololo" which was run Nigerian radio stations between 2011 and 2012. He also dropped songs such as: "Love song" and "Happy". With these songs, he toured about four states across the country, performing at the Glo Rock n Roll show, the Star Quest Grand Finale, the annual Kennis Music Easter Fiesta and other big stages.

He is often compared to 2Baba (also known as 2Face Idibia and TuFace), a Nigerian music legend, due to their facial resemblance. In 2014, he expressed his admiration for 2Baba, and also that he would like to collaborate with him. In 2014, Joe El released the video of a song titled "Hold On" featuring 2Baba. The video was directed by Clarence Peters and produced by Grammy Award winning Hakim Abdulsamad. The video later got nominated for The Headies award for best collaboration in 2015.

In 2014, his song, "Oya Now" in which he featured Oritsefemi got another nomination for The Headies Best Collaboration Video award. He got two more nominations in the NMVA 2014 edition, one for his song, "You Are In Love" which was nominated for Best R'n'b Video category which was won by Niyola and the other for his new video "Oya Now" nominated for Best Video by A New Act which he won.

In 2019, he teamed up with Masterkraft to produce a dance song titled "Rawa" (Dance).

Discography

Songs
 "Gbemisoke", 2016
 "Nwanyi Oma"
 "Keep Loving"
 "Yamarita" (featuring Olamide)
 "Chukwudi" (featuring Iyanya)
 "Celebrate" (featuring Yemi Alade)
 "Oya Now" (featuring Oritsefemi)
 "Rawa (dance)", 2019
 "Epo" (featuring Davido, Zlatan)

Albums
 Songs
 Hold On
 Timeless (2015)
 Do Good (2016)
 She Like Me
 Onye (Eji Kolo)
 You Are In Love
 I No Mind

Compilations featured
 "Bridal" (featuring Sound Sultan and Honorebel)
 Kennis Music All Starz Compilation'' (2011)

Awards and nominations

References

People from Kaduna State
21st-century Nigerian male singers
Living people
Musicians from Lagos
Nigerian hip hop singers
Nigerian male singer-songwriters
People from Benue State
Year of birth missing (living people)